Shadrach Kwesi Eghan (born 4 July 1994) is a Ghanaian footballer who plays as a midfielder for Al-Zawra'a SC in Iraq.

Career
Born in Akosombo, Eghan started his career with Akosombo-based Football Academie Golden Boot Academy. He joined than in the summer of 2010 to Swedish lower side IFK Klagshamn, which loaned him for a half year, to the reserve side of Malmö FF. He played three years with Klagshamn and moved in January 2013 to Jong Twente.

On 28 April 2013, Eghan made his debut for FC Twente in the match against NEC.

In 2019, he signed for Al-Zawraa in Iraq.

Career statistics

References

External links
 Voetbal International profile 

1994 births
Living people
Association football midfielders
Ghanaian footballers
Ghanaian expatriate footballers
Eredivisie players
Eerste Divisie players
Eliteserien players
Danish 1st Division players
FC Twente players
Vendsyssel FF players
Go Ahead Eagles players
SC Telstar players
Expatriate footballers in the Netherlands
Expatriate footballers in Iraq
Ghanaian expatriate sportspeople in Iraq
Jong FC Twente players
Ghanaian expatriate sportspeople in the Netherlands
Ghanaian expatriate sportspeople in Norway
Ghanaian expatriate sportspeople in Denmark
Ghanaian expatriate sportspeople in Sweden
Expatriate men's footballers in Denmark
Expatriate footballers in Norway
Expatriate footballers in Sweden
Stabæk Fotball players
Malmö FF players